ERW may refer to:

 Electric resistance welding
 Energy return wheel, an airless tire
 Enhanced radiation weapon
 Explosive remnants of war, a term for unexploded ordnance
 Enhanced rock weathering
 Equal Rights Washington, an LGBT advocacy and community outreach organization in Washington state, U.S.
 Erw, the unit for the Welsh acre